Kevin Sprouls is the creator of the Wall Street Journal portrait style known as hedcut.

He began as a freelance illustrator for Dow Jones and Company, the parent company for The Wall Street Journal.  In 1979 he introduced a style of stipple portraiture that the Journal adopted because it was reminiscent of the sort of old engravings that are found on bank notes.  Kevin became the first full-time artist at the Journal, eventually the Assistant Art Director and head of the illustration department.  His Wall Street Journal stipple illustrations were awarded a gold medal at The Society of Illustrators competition in 1986.  His style of portraiture, later coined hedcut, is the definitive corporate icon and is created completely by hand, not computer.

Sprouls is once again a freelance artist but still works for Dow Jones on occasion, along with a host of other publishing clients. He has been featured on CNN, in the American National Portrait Gallery and in the Smithsonian magazine.

His pen is housed in the Newseum in Washington.

External links
 Kevin Sprouls’s homepage
 Kevin Sprouls—Blog site for Kevin Sprouls
 How a Photo Becomes a Wall Street Journal Hedcut at DowJones.com (PDF)
 Ink Dot Art in the Smithsonian magazine
 Getting Inside Their Heds—a chapter from Picturing Business in America. Hedcuts in The Wall Street Journal, an article on the National Portrait Gallery website

American illustrators
The Wall Street Journal people
Living people
Year of birth missing (living people)